is a freight station on Hachinohe Rinkai Railway Line in Hachinohe, Aomori, Japan. This station is the terminal station of the line. Industrial railway connects this station and Mitsubishi Paper Co. factory.

Surrounding area 
 Mitsubishi Paper Mills Limited Hachinohe Factory
 Hachinohe Seiren Co.

History 
 25 March 1966 Open as a station of Aomori Prefecture Industrial Railway.
 1 December 1970 Inherited by Hachinohe Rinkai Railway

Adjacent stations 
 Hachinohe Rinkai Railway
 Hachinohe Rinkai Railway Line
 Hachinohe Freight Station - Kitanuma Station

See also
 List of railway stations in Japan

Stations of Hachinohe Rinkai Railway
Railway stations in Aomori Prefecture
Railway stations in Japan opened in 1966